Dinicotinic acid (pyridine-3,5-dicarboxylic acid) is a heterocyclic organic compound, more precisely a heteroaromatic. It is one of many pyridinedicarboxylic acids and consists of a pyridine ring carrying to carboxy groups in the 3- and 5-positions.

Preparation and properties 
Dinicotinic acid can be formed by heating pyridine-2,3,5,6-tetracarboxylic acid or carbodinicotinic acid (pyridine-2,3,5-tricarboxylic acid).

The acid is sparingly soluble in water and ether. Its melting point of 323 °C is the highest among pyridinedicarboxylic acids. Upon heating, it decarboxylates and decomposes to nicotinic acid:

References

See also
 Dipicolinic acid, an isomeric dicarboxylic acid

Pyridines
Dicarboxylic acids
Aromatic acids